Vintergatan (Swedish name for the Milky Way or "Winter Street") were TV series broadcast in 2000, 2001, 2003 and 2010 by Sveriges Television and directed and written by Petter Bragée.

Vintergatan 5a
Vintergatan 5a was broadcast as "Sommarlovsmorgon" Monday–Friday 13 June–11 August 2000.

Plot
Mira is forced by her father to go to Älguddens sommarkollo ("Älgudden Summer Camp"). She goes to Älgudden by taxi with two school mates Henrik and Glen. On the way, the engine breaks and they stay in the forest while Peo, the taxi driver, angrily tries to repair it. Suddenly they see a bright light and later they are beamed up to a space ship where they meet a figure called Alien, who tells them how to control the space ship and gives them several mission to collect raunkiær plant life-form from planets.

They go through black holes to complete Alien's missions. They meet dangers on the space ship as down on the planets. They visit 5 planets:
1."Ökenplaneten Zoltzy" ("The Desert Planet Zoltzy"), where they must to find a special moss and are near to be left forever.
2."Skogsplaneten Filione" ("The Forest Planet Filione"), where they must to find a special type of beetle and get Femman as a stowaway.
3."Grottplaneten Zeryj" ("The Cave Planet Zeryj"), where they find a special type of fisk and are attacked by "Grottmonstret" ("the Cave monster").
4."Havsplaneten Zinij" ("The Sea Planet Zinij"), where they must get a pod from a carnivorous plant and are attacked by one who shoots Glen with a dart so he becomes comatose for five days.
5."Domedagsplaneten Krasnyj" ("The Last Judgment Planet Krasnyj"), where they must find a cylinder containing the entire history of planet and are attacked by "mutants" ("mutant" in singular). One of them becomes beamed up to the space ship and follows them back home to the Earth in the end.

Because they worked well together, they could complete the missions and return to Earth. Alien, who disappeared in the end out into space, gave them the missions for "att ge vår planet och mänskligheten en ny chans att överleva" ("giving our planet and the humans a new chance to survive").

In this TV series viewers could call the program and help the characters; for example, someone told them that "nedstrålningsplatsen var vid den brutna antennen som Peo kastade" ("the down-beaming place was at the broken antenna which Peo threw") when they needed help on "Sandplaneten".

The next summer Vintergatan 5a was followed up by Vintergatan 5b.

Selected cast
Philoméne Grandin as Mira
Wilson D. Michaels as Glen
Pelle Hanæus as Henrik
Anders Linder as Peo and Kapten Zoom
Thomas Hellberg as Alien (voice)
Jonas Sykfont as Femman
Per-Axel Gjöres as Taxi chief
Christina Göransson as Ulla, Peo's wife

Vintergatan 5b
Vintergatan 5b was broadcast as "Sommarlovsmorgon" Monday–Friday 11 June–10 August 2001. It followed up Vintergatan 5a which was broadcast as "Sommarlovsmorgon" the year before, and even in this TV series, viewers could call the program, for example when the characters needed help.

Plot
Peo's wife Ulla has disappeared and he tells Mira, Glen, and Henrik to follow him out into space to try to find her. When they visit "Lavaplaneten" ("The Lava Planet"), Mira also disappears. In the TV series they also meet new characters, among them Irina Teresjkova (who was beamed up from 1963 in her "Sputnik 1"), Benke Bengtsson and Gaia and Garsson (who both work at a "rymdmack" ("space petrol station")). They get material which may help them and in the end they know that Mira, and also Sjuan (Femman's younger sister, played by Bodil Ekelund), are kidnapped by "figures with hats with lamps" called "fifuner" ("fifun" in singular) on their planet "Karichnivi". But Ulla is not there, instead, she has been sitting frozen down in a refrigerator in the machine room of the space ship the whole summer. Femman found her but didn't say it until the end of the adventure because of "Ingen frågade" ("no one asked").

The new characters are played by Jonas Sykfont (Femman/Benke Bengtsson/Garsson), Ingela Schale (Irina) and Inga Sarri (Gaia).

"Gaia" is only the title of the space station owner. When Gaia and Garsson quit as owners, Peo and Ulla take over and are called "Gaia" ("Gaior" in plural).

Again, they go through black holes to complete their mission. They meet dangers on the space ship as down on the planets. They visit 5 planets:
"Lavaplaneten Tjårnyj" ("The Lava Planet Tjornyj"), where they meet the pilgrim Melvis and finds out Mira is being kidnapped.
"Skogsplaneten Filione" ("The Forest Planet Filione"), where they get to know the kidnappers are called "Fifuner".
"Sandplaneten Bely" ("The Sand Planet Bely"), where they find out the "Fun-lab" is being moved to another planet. They also meet Kubrik, who lives in a tent.
"Poolplaneten" ("The Pool Planet"), where they get a map and coordinates towards the lab where their friends are being trapped. They also meet Kubrik's brother, Rubrik, who also lives in a tent with his giant crab Krackén.
"Labbplaneten Karichnivi" ("The Lab Planet Karichnivi"), where they open all cages with the kidnapped creatures, including Mira and Sjuan.

Citation
Henrik claimed in the 4th program that "Yuri Gagarin dog I en flygolycka för 37 år sen" ("Yuri Gagarin died in a flying accident 37 years ago"). But this claim was wrong because he died in 1968. In 2001, when this program aired, 1968 was 33 years ago, not 37.

Tillbaka till VintergatanTillbaka till Vintergatan ("Back to the Milky Way") was broadcast in 2003, but has been reprised several times. It is a cropped version of Vintergatan 5a and 5b. Now Peo is Gaia at the space station and he tells Garsson, who visits him, about the adventures during the summers of 2000 and 2001.

Vid Vintergatans slutVid Vintergatans slut ("At the end of the Milky Way") followed up Vintergatan 5a and 5b and was  first broadcast on 30 January 2010, then on Saturdays. It was produced, by Anagram Produktion, during the spring of 2009.

Plot
Vid Vintergatans slut takes place almost 20 years after Vintergatan 5a and 5b. Mira (Philoméne Grandin) has now been the mother to the 13-year-old girl Billie (Fanny Ketter) and they live a good life on the Earth. Peo's (Anders Linder) and Ulla's (Christina Göransson) time as "Gaior" is soon finished, but the calm at Milky Way ("Vintergatan") is over. Every space figure is threatened. Ulla disappears again and the worried Peo sends the cargo ship pilot Pax (Sanna Persson Halapi) to the Earth for getting Mira who may help him. But instead, Pax by mistake gets Billie, Mira's daughter. Almost at the same time Pax returns to the space station, Peo has been near to be murdered by the "fun" captain Storm (Per-Axel Gjöres) who works in "Triumvirate" together with Professor (Eva Westerling), Lennartsson (André Wickström) and Greven (Anders Jansson). The storm blows up the space station but Peo saves himself in an emergency capsule before it's too late.

They visit 2 planets and one asteroid:
1."Bergsplaneten Ürgüp" ("The Mountain Planet Ürgüp"), where they meet "ürgüpper" (in English "ürgüps") and find the Palace of the Count. Mira once again gets kidnapped by the "Fifuner".
2."Skogsplaneten Filione'''" ("The Forest Planet Filione"), where they get help from Kapten Zoom and Femman.
3."Svarta Asteroiden'" ("The Black Asteroid"), where they paralyze the "Triumvirate" and get Mira and Ulla out of the cages.

Selected cast
Fanny Ketter as BilliePhilomène Grandin as MiraSanna Persson Halapi as PaxAnders Jansson as GrevenEva Westerling as ProfessornAndré Wickström as LennartssonPer-Axel Gjöres as StormAlexander Karim as CronaJohan Wester as Billie's teacher''

References

External links
Official website
Vintergatan videos on YouTube
Interview with the director Petter Bragée
Vintergatan Quiz

Swedish children's television series
Swedish science fiction television series
Sveriges Television original programming
2000s Swedish television series
2010s Swedish television series
2000 Swedish television series debuts
Swedish-language television shows